Who Am I This Time? is a 1982 American made-for-television comedy-drama film directed by Jonathan Demme and based on the 1961 short story of the same name by Kurt Vonnegut. It is the fourth episode of the first season of PBS' American Playhouse series which aired on February 2, 1982.

Plot
Christopher Walken portrays Harry Nash, a hardware store clerk who has achieved a degree of local celebrity due to his powerful performances in community theatre. Yet when not on the stage or in a rehearsal, Harry retreats into an insecure and painfully shy personality. He remains unsocial most of the time.

The story is set in motion when Helene Shaw (Susan Sarandon), a woman intending to stay in town for only eight weeks, is persuaded into auditioning for the role of Stella, opposite Harry's Stanley Kowalski in a production of A Streetcar Named Desire.

Ignoring warnings of Harry's introverted personality, Helene falls in love with Harry's "Stanley" persona, and mistakes his cluelessness and shyness for rejection.  This results in a clumsy and uneven performance on the second night of the play, but Helene bounces back in time for closing night, due to an inspiration: her closing-night gift to Harry is a copy of Romeo and Juliet. Harry and Helene find that they can pursue a relationship by reciting stage romances to each other, and the story ends with him proposing, in character, from a scene in Oscar Wilde's The Importance of Being Earnest.

Cast
 Susan Sarandon as Helene Shaw
 Christopher Walken as Harry Nash
 Robert Ridgely as George Johnson
 Dorothy Patterson as Doris
 Caitlin Hart as Lydia
 Les Podewell as Les
 Aaron Freeman as Andrew

Production

Music
The film's score was composed by John Cale of The Velvet Underground.  Hinckley, Illinois served as stand-in for fictional North Crawford.

Writing
The quotations recited by the actors, from Cyrano de Bergerac to The Importance of Being Earnest, are often paraphrased. In the opening act, Harry Nash delivers the final lines of Cyrano, which were taken not from the well-known translations of the standard texts, but from the film adaptation Cyrano de Bergerac (1950), with translation by Brian Hooker. Edmond Rostand's final two words in the original French version were My panache!, which is usually used in translations.

Hooker's version, which Christopher Walken/Cyrano declaims, changes his final phrase to "My white plume!"  Panache means plume; here, the literary reference is to King Henry IV of France, who was famous for wearing a white plume in his helmet and for his war cry: "Follow my white plume!" (French: Ralliez-vous à mon panache blanc!).

Another slight variation occurs in the final lines, when Helene accepts Harry's proposal of marriage and says, "I hope that after we marry, you'll always look at me just like this... especially in front of other people!" In the original play by Oscar Wilde, the line is, "I hope you will always look at me just like that, especially when there are other people present."

In Vonnegut's short story, the character George Johnson is the first-person narrator. He meets Helene while trying to sort out a phone bill and asks her to try out for the local play.

Reception 
The film holds a 92% "Fresh" rating on aggregate review site Rotten Tomatoes, based on 354 user ratings.

The New York Times published a review saying that the script was "touchingly adapted" from Vonnegut's story.

Howard Rosenberg of the Los Angeles Times called Who Am I This Time? "a smashing adaptation of a Kurt Vonnegut story."  Daily Variety praised Demme, saying he "directed with finesse," and said that producer Neal Miller "coaxes his characters along with becoming humor."

Joe Meyers, host of the debut of the second annual "Short Cuts" series celebrating the art of the short film at the Garden Cinema festival in Norwalk, Connecticut in 2011, described the film as "one of the most charming short films of the modern era."

Time Out (London) called the film "totally delightful" with "a great deal of charm and wit."

Dramatist/reviewer Sheila O'Malley writes that Who Am I This Time? is "one of the best movies about acting, and what it is, and why, that I have ever seen... it is a funny and accurate look at why grown men and women put on costumes and cavort about with fake swords for a paying populace."

Awards and honors 

Who Am I This Time? won the "Best Television Production Award" at the Semana Internacional De Cinema de Barcelona, invitational screenings in Russia (ACT I) and Italy (Venice Film Festival), and at the San Francisco International Film Festival.

References

External links

 

1982 television films
1982 films
1982 comedy-drama films
American comedy-drama films
Films based on works by Kurt Vonnegut
Films directed by Jonathan Demme
Films scored by John Cale
Films based on short fiction
American Playhouse
1980s English-language films
1980s American films